Okuninka  is a village in the administrative district of Gmina Włodawa, within Włodawa County, Lublin Voivodeship, in eastern Poland, close to the border with Belarus.

The village has a population of only 399, but serves as a host of accommodation services to vast yet specific groups of tourists dispatched mainly from Lublin, including water-resort explorers, environmentalists, and families. It is affordable, and highly rated by students of mid-schools from the whole of the Lublin are. The farmers who can see the perspectives there, thus strive to contact and operate within Kameralne Pojezierze offering local products, even if the main part of a whole lakeland is located more to the west.

The lakeland area in between Łęczna and Włodawa is conveniently located near the national Route 82. It is a friendly vibrant center of agritourism. Harbouring many venues around Okuninka, while the area that neighbors the middle of the Bug river valley (recognized as a part of NATURA2000 zone), remains accessible by a number of means, including kayaking.

References

Okuninka